Dom is the surname of:

 Annelies Dom (born 1986), Belgian racing cyclist
 Jeanny Dom, Luxembourgian retired table tennis player
 Joren Dom (born 1989), Belgian footballer
 Martinus Dom (1791–1873), first abbot of the Trappist Abbey of Westmalle in Belgium and founder of the Trappist brewery